Lyakhi is a rural locality (a selo) and the administrative center of Lyakhovskoye Rural Settlement, Melenkovsky District, Vladimir Oblast, Russia. The population was 1,448 as of 2010. There are 17 streets.

Geography 
Lyakhi is located on the Oka River, 20 km east of Melenki (the district's administrative centre) by road. Chernichenka is the nearest rural locality.

References 

Rural localities in Melenkovsky District
Melenkovsky Uyezd